NASU Institute of Electrodynamics (IED) is a Ukraine leading science institution in field of electrical engineering, thermal power (heat energy), and research of electrodynamics located in Kyiv, Ukraine as a part of the Ukrainian Academy of Sciences. It is well known for the prominent achievements in the field of computer science and electronics, made in early 1950s by Sergei Alekseyevich Lebedev.

The institute was established in 1947 on the basis of electrical engineering department of the NASU Energy Institute as the NASU Institute of Electrical Engineering. In 1963 it was renamed as the NASU Institute of Electrodynamics.

Notable achievements
 MESM, an abbreviation for small electronic calculating system

Directors
 1947 — 1952 Sergei Lebedev
 1952 — 1959 Anatoliy Nesterenko
 1959 — 1973 Oleksandr Milyakh
 1973 — 2007 Anatoliy Shydlovskyi
 2007 — Oleksandr Kyrylenko

External links 
  Official website
  IED NASU. National Academy of Sciences of Ukraine

Research institutes in Kyiv
Computing in the Soviet Union
Research institutes in the Soviet Union
Institutes of the National Academy of Sciences of Ukraine
Computer science institutes in Ukraine
Energy research institutes